Eugene Cook may refer to:

Eugene A. Cook, Associate Justice of the Texas Supreme Court
Eugene Cook (musician), leader of the band Synco Six, one-time band of musician Alphonse Trent
Eugene Cook (Georgia judge), Associate Justice of the Supreme Court of Georgia

See also
Gene Cook, American football player